Together for Vojvodina (ZZV) is a political party in Serbia representing the Rusyn minority. It has been led by Olena Papuga since its formation in 2011.

In the National Assembly of Serbia, ZZV was represented by Papuga until 2020, while following the 2022 parliamentary election, ZZV has been represented by Aleksandar Olenik. ZZV retains close relations with the League of Social Democrats of Vojvodina, of which Papuga is a member of. It is an autonomist party, while it also declares itself to be in favour of multiculturalism and the accession of Serbia to the European Union.

History 
ZZV was founded on 1 November 2011 and was registered as a political party on 8 December 2011. Olena Papuga, a League of Social Democrats of Vojvodina (LSV) member of the National Assembly, became the president of the party; she stated that she would retain her membership in LSV and that ZZV would act close to it. Papuga was listed as the 58th candidate on the Choice for a Better Life (IZBŽ) list in the 2012 parliamentary election. The IZBŽ coalition won 67 seats; Papuga was re-elected as member of the National Assembly. ZZV later took part in the 2014 parliamentary election with LSV and the New Democratic Party, later known as Social Democratic Party (SDS); Papuga was listed as the third candidate on its list. The coalition received 18 seats in the National Assembly, with Papuga being re-elected.

In the 2016 parliamentary election, ZZV took part in a coalition with LSV, SDS, and the Liberal Democratic Party. Papuga was listed as the ninth candidate on the list. The coalition won 13 seats, with Papuga retaining her seat in the National Assembly. In December 2019, ZZV signed the "Memorandum on the Future of Vojvodina" which stated the need for decentralisation and the establishment "of the true autonomy for Vojvodina". As part of the Vojvodina Front, ZZV took part in the foundation of the United Democratic Serbia (UDS) coalition. UDS did not cross the 3% electoral threshold and Papuga lost her seat in the National Assembly, however the Vojvodina Front won 3 seats in the City Assembly of Novi Sad.

In preparation for the 2022 parliamentary election, ZZV formed a coalition with the Democratic Alliance of Croats in Vojvodina (DSHV). A minority of members of the Republic Electoral Commission raised the suspicion of the coalition abusing the right to run as a national minority list because the candidates were from non-minority parties, primarily from LSV. This coalition received public support from LSV and the Vojvodina's Party. The ZZV–DSHV coalition, dubbed as "Vojvodinians", campaigned on "bringing Vojvodina back to the National Assembly", while it also voiced support for progressive policies, multiculturalism, fiscal decentralisation, and "dirty technologies". One of its representatives, Tomislav Žigmanov of DSHV, stated its support for the accession of Serbia to the European Union and NATO. The coalition won 2 seats in the National Assembly, one of which went to Aleksandar Olenik of ZZV. ZZV became part of the European Regions parliamentary group, which was chaired by Olenik. Žigmanov announced on 23 October 2022 that he accepted the position of becoming the minister of human and minority rights and social dialogue; Olenik then terminated the ZZV–DSHV coalition. The parliamentary group was dissolved two days later.

Political positions 
ZZV represents the Rusyn ethnic minority in Serbia. It is an autonomist party. According to its political programme, ZZV is also supportive of multiculturalism, environmental protection, equal rights for the Rusyn ethnic minority, and the accession of Serbia to the European Union.

Organisation 
ZZV is led by Olena Papuga. Its headquarters are located at Fruškogorska 95a in Ruski Krstur.

List of presidents

Electoral performance

Parliamentary elections

References

Primary sources 
In the text these references are preceded by a double dagger (‡):

External links 

 Official website

2011 establishments in Serbia
Political parties established in 2011
Pro-European political parties in Serbia
Centre-left parties in Europe
Rusyn political parties